OFV may refer to:

Offenburger FV
Orchid fleck virus
Opplysningsrådet for Veitrafikken
Austrian Fencing Federation (Österreichischer Fechtverband)